Obluchensky District is an administrative and municipal district (raion), one of the five in the Jewish Autonomous Oblast, Russia. It is located in the north, east, and center of the autonomous oblast. Its administrative center is the town of Obluchye. Population: 29,035 (2010 Census);  The population of Obluchye accounts for 32.3% of the district's total population.

Geography  
Obluchensky District is located in the northwest region of the Jewish Autonomous Oblast; it is the largest district in the oblast. About 50 km of the Amur River runs along the western border of Obluchensky. The Bira basin runs west-to-east through the middle of the district, and is relatively narrow. Most of the larger towns of the district are along the Bira. The southeastern area of the district lies on the lowlands and plains of the Amur itself. The district is about 150 km west of the city of Khabarovsk, and the area measures 90 km (north-south) by 190 km (west-east). The Bastak Nature Reserve is located in Obluchensky and Biroidzhansky Districts.

The district is bordered on the north and east by Khabarovsk Krai, on the west by China across the Amur, and on the south by Birobidzhansky District, Leninsky District, and Oktyabrsky District.

References

Notes

Sources

External links
Obluchensky District on Google Maps
Obluchensky District on OpenStreetMap

Districts of Jewish Autonomous Oblast